Wyoming Highway 342 (WYO 342) is a  east-west Wyoming State Road in south-central Sheridan County.

Route description
Wyoming Highway 342 begins its western end at U.S. Route 87 (unsigned WYO 344) and heads east for 1.14 miles and ends at Interstate 90 (exit 33). 
Meade Creek Road itself continues another 3.7 miles to end at U.S. Route 14 northeast of here.

Major intersections

References

External links 

Wyoming State Routes 300-399
WYO 342 - I-90 to US-87

Transportation in Sheridan County, Wyoming
342